Bialis is a surname. Notable people with the surname include:

Laura Bialis, American-Israeli filmmaker
Morris Bialis (1897–1996), American labor union leader

See also
Biali